Within the North Atlantic Ocean, a Category 3 hurricane is a tropical cyclone, that has 1-minute sustained wind speeds of between . Since the beginning of the Atlantic hurricane database in 1851, 162 tropical cyclones peaked at Category 3 strength on the Saffir–Simpson scale in the Atlantic basin, which covers the waters of the Atlantic Ocean north of the equator, the Caribbean Sea, and the Gulf of Mexico. This list does not include hurricanes that intensified further to a Category 4 or 5, the latter being the highest ranking on the scale.

Collectively, Category 3 Atlantic hurricanes caused nearly $100 billion in damage. Most of the damage total was caused by Hurricane Sandy in 2012, which left $68.7 billion in damage when it struck New Jersey as a post-tropical cyclone, and which was briefly a major hurricane near Cuba.

The known Category 3 hurricanes cumulatively killed 18,361 people, including 7,469 in the 2nd half of the 19th century, 7,541 in the 20th century, and 3,351 so far in the 21st century. Four hurricanes accounted for more than half of the recorded deaths. In 1870, a hurricane killed 1,200 people in Cuba. The 1893 Sea Islands hurricane left over 1,000 casualties when it struck the U.S. state of Georgia. In 1909, a hurricane killed about 4,000 people when it moved ashore northeast Mexico. More recently, Hurricane Jeanne in 2004 killed more than 3,000 people when it moved near Haiti.

Background

In 1972, the National Hurricane Center (NHC) began ranking hurricanes according to wind speed with the Saffir–Simpson scale. These winds are estimated using a blend of data from different sources, including observations from nearby ships, reconnaissance aircraft, automatic weather stations, and images from various satellites.

Landfalling storms of Category 3 intensity can cause significant structural damage. The winds are strong enough to knock down trees, blow out windows, destroy roofs, and cause lengthy power outages. Such storms pose a risk of injury or death to humans and animals in the storm path.

Systems

1850s

|-
| San Agapito ||  ||  ||  || The Caribbean, Florida ||   ||   ||
|-
| One ||  ||  ||  || Southeastern United States ||  ||  ||
|-
| Four ||  ||  ||  || None ||  ||  ||
|-
| Three ||  ||  ||  || Southeastern United States ||  ||  ||
|-
| Five ||  ||  ||  || Louisiana, Mississippi ||  ||  ||
|-
| Five ||  ||  ||  || Bahamas, Cuba, Florida ||  ||  ||
|-
| Six ||  ||  ||  || Cuba, Bahamas ||  ||  ||
|}

1860-1900s

|-
|  ||  ||  ||  || Lesser Antilles, Puerto Rico ||  ||  ||
|-
|  ||  ||  ||  || New England ||  || ||
|-
|  ||  ||  ||  || Bermuda || || ||
|-
|  ||  ||  ||  || Cuba, Florida Keys || || ||
|-
|  ||  ||  ||  || Bahamas, Florida || || ||
|-
|  ||  ||  ||  || Lesser Antilles, Puerto Rico, Bahamas, Florida || || ||
|-
|  ||  ||  ||  || Atlantic Canada || || ||
|-
|  ||  ||  ||  || Haiti, Cuba, Florida || || ||
|-
|  ||  ||  ||  || Lesser Antilles, Greater Antilles, Texas || || ||
|-
|  ||  ||  || < || Lesser Antilles, Greater Antilles, East Coast of the United States || || ||
|-
|  ||  ||  ||  || Cuba, Florida || || ||
|-
|  ||  ||  ||  || Curacao, East Coast of the United States || || 
|-
|  ||  ||  ||  || No land areas || || || 
|-
|  ||  ||  ||  || East Coast of the United States ||  || || 
|-
|  ||  ||  ||  || Louisiana ||  || ||
|-
|  ||  ||  ||  || Bahamas, Cuba, Florida  || ||.
|-
|  ||  ||  ||  || Bermuda, Atlantic Canada || || ||
|-
|  ||  ||  ||  || Caribbean, Bahamas, North Carolina ||  || || 
|-
|  ||  ||  ||  || No land areas || || ||
|-
|  ||  ||  ||  || Caribbean, Bahamas ||  || || 
|-
|  ||  ||  ||  || Atlantic Canada || || || 
|-
|  ||  ||  ||  || Cuba, Louisiana, Texas || || || 
|-
|  ||  ||  ||  || Florida || || || 
|-
|  ||  ||  ||  || Cuba, Bahamas || || || 
|-
|  ||  ||  ||  || Southeastern United States|| || 
|-
|  ||  ||  ||  || Turks and Caicos, Cuba, Mexico || || || 
|-
|  ||  ||  ||  || Newfoundland ||  || || 
|-
|  ||  ||  ||  || Martinique, Puerto Rico, Turks and Caicos, Florida || || || 
|-
|  ||  ||  ||  || Lesser Antilles, Puerto Rico, Atlantic Canada ||  || || 
|-
|  ||  ||  ||  || New York, New England || || || 
|-
|  ||  ||  ||  || Bahamas, Southeastern United States || || || 
|-
|  ||  ||  ||  || Bahamas, Southeastern United States || || || 
|-
|  ||  ||  ||  || No land areas || || || 
|-
|  ||  ||  ||  || Lesser Antilles, Hispaniola, Cuba, southeastern United States || || || 
|-
|  ||  ||  ||  || Southeastern United States, northeastern United States || || 
|-
|  ||  ||  ||  || Caribbean, New England || || || 
|-
|  ||   ||  ||  || Southeastern United States ||  ||  || 
|-
|  ||  ||  ||  || Caribbean, Bermuda, Atlantic Canada ||  || || 
|}

1900s

|-
| Two ||  ||  ||  || None ||  ||  ||
|-
| Two ||  ||  ||  || Lesser Antilles, Jamaica, Mexico ||  ||  ||
|-
| Unnamed ||  ||  ||  || Greater Antilles, Bermuda, Atlantic Canada ||  ||  ||
|-
| Unnamed ||  ||  ||  || Gulf Coast of the United States ||  ||  || 
|-
| Unnamed ||  ||  ||  || Central America, Cuba, Florida ||  ||  || 
|-
| Unnamed ||   ||  ||  || Caribbean, Turks and Caicos, Bahamas ||  || || 
|-
| Unnamed ||  ||  ||  || Cuba, Texas ||  ||  ||
|-
| Six ||  ||  ||  || The Caribbean, Mexico ||  ||  ||
|-
| Nine ||  ||  ||  || Greater Antiles, Louisiana, Arkansas ||  ||  ||
|-
| Eleven ||  ||  ||  || Cuba, Florida, The Bahamas ||  ||  ||
|}

1910s

|-
| Seven ||  ||  ||  || Jamaica ||  ||  || 
|-
| Three ||  ||  ||  || Bermuda || ||  ||
|-
| Two ||  ||  ||  || United States Gulf Coast || ||  ||
|-
| Four ||  ||  ||  || Carolinas || ||  ||
|-
| Eleven ||  ||  ||  || Bermuda || || ||
|-
| Thirteen ||  ||  ||  || Lesser Antiles || || ||
|-
| Three ||  ||  ||  || Bermuda || || ||
|-
| One ||  ||  ||  || Louisiana ||  ||  ||
|}

>1920s

|-
|  ||  ||  ||  || Windward Islands, Greater Antilles ||  || || 
|-
|  ||   ||  ||  || Leeward Islands, Bermuda || || ||
|-
|  ||   ||  ||  || Bahamas, Newfoundland || || ||
|-
|  ||  ||  ||  || Puerto Rico, East Coast of the United States ||  || ||
|-
|  ||  ||  ||  || Bermuda, Atlantic Canada ||  || || 
|-
|  ||  ||  ||  || Louisiana ||  ||   || 
|-
|  ||  ||  ||  || East Coast of the United States, Atlantic Canada ||  ||   || 
|-
|  ||  ||  ||  || Bermuda || || || 
|-
|  ||  ||  ||  || Jamaica, Cuba, Florida, Bahamas, Atlantic Canada ||  ||  || 
|-
|  ||  ||  ||  || Bermuda || || ||  
|-
|  ||  ||  ||  || East Coast of the United States ||  ||  ||  
|-
|  ||   ||  ||  || No land areas || || || 
|-
|  ||  ||  ||  || Mexico || || || 
|-
|  ||  ||  ||  || Central United States, Canada ||  ||  || 
|-
|  ||  ||  ||  || Bahamas, Southeastern United States ||  ||  || 
|-
|  ||  ||  ||  || Mexico, Texas ||  ||  || 
|-
|  ||  ||  || || Bermuda, Atlantic Canada || || || 
|-
|  ||  ||  ||  || Windward Islands, Jamaica, Mexico ||  || ||
|-
|  ||  ||  ||  || Texas ||  || ||
|-
|  ||  ||  ||  || Bermuda || || ||
|-
|  ||  ||  ||  || East Coast of the United States, Atlantic Canada || ||  || 
|-
| ||  || ||  || Cuba, Florida, Bahamas, Bermuda ||  ||  ||
|-
|  ||   ||  ||  || Bermuda, Newfoundland || || ||
|-
|  ||  ||  ||  || East Coast of the United States, Atlantic Canada ||  ||  || 
|-
|  ||  ||  ||  || Cuba, Florida ||  ||  ||
|-
|  ||  ||  ||  || No land areas || || ||
|-
|  ||  ||  ||  || No land areas || || ||
|-
|  ||  ||  ||  || Puerto Rico, Bermuda ||  ||  ||
|-
|  ||  ||  ||  || Bermuda || || ||
|-
|  ||   ||  ||  || Gulf Coast of the United States || ||  ||
|-
|  ||  ||  ||  || East Coast of the United States, Atlantic Canada  ||  ||
|-
|  ||  ||  ||  || New England, Atlantic Canada ||  ||  ||
|-
|  ||  ||  ||  || Cuba, Mexico ||  ||  ||
|-
|  ||  ||  ||  || Leeward Islands, Puerto Rico, Bahamas ||  ||
|-
|  ||  ||  ||  || Gulf Coast of the United States, Canada ||  ||  ||
|-
|  ||  ||  ||  || Azores || || ||
|-
|  ||  ||  ||  || Gulf Coast of the United States ||  ||  || 
|-
|  ||  ||  ||  || Leeward Islands, Bermuda || || ||
|-
|  ||  ||  ||  || No land areas || || ||
|-
|  ||  ||  ||  || Cuba, East Coast of the United States ||  || ||
|-
|  ||  ||  ||  || Central America, Cuba, East Coast of the United States ||  ||  || 
|-
|  ||  ||  ||  || Atlantic Canada, Northern Europe ||  || ||
|-
|  ||  ||  ||  || Atlantic Canada || || ||
|-
|  ||   ||  ||  || Central America ||  ||  ||
|-
|  ||  ||  ||  || East Coast of the United States, Atlantic Canada || ||  ||
|-
|  ||   ||  ||  || Bermuda || || || 
|-
|  ||  ||  ||  || Cuba, Florida, Texas ||  || ||
|-
|  ||   ||  ||  || No land areas || || ||
|-
|  ||  ||  ||  || No land areas || || ||
|-
|  ||  ||  ||  || Turks and Caicos, Cuba, Mexico ||  || ||
|-
|  ||  ||  ||  || Lesser Antilles, Greater Antilles, Yucatán peninsula, Gulf Coast of the United States, eastern United States ||  || ||
|-
|  ||  ||  ||  || East Coast of the United States || ||
|-
|  ||   ||  ||  || No land areas || || ||
|-
|  ||  ||  ||  || Cape Verde || || ||
|-
|  ||  ||  ||  || Lesser Antilles, Bermuda || || ||
|-
|  ||  ||  ||  || No land areas || || ||
|-
|  ||   ||  ||  || Texas ||  ||  ||
|-
| || ||  ||  || Cuba, Mississippi || 9 || $1.3 billion
|
|-
|  ||  ||  ||  || Cuba, Florida ||  ||  ||
|-
|  ||   ||  ||  || Lesser Antilles, Greater Antilles, Bermuda, Bahamas ||  ||  || 
|-
|  ||  ||  ||  || No Land Areas || 0 || Minimal ||
|-
|  ||   ||  ||  || East Coast of the United States, Nova Scotia ||  ||  ||
|-
|  ||  ||  ||  || North Carolina ||  ||  ||
|-
|  ||  ||  ||  || United States Virgin Islands, Puerto Rico, Dominica, Martinique, Guadeloupe ||  ||
|-
|  ||  ||  ||  || Yucatán Peninsula, Veracruz, Tabasco ||  ||  ||
|-
|  ||  ||  ||  || Northeastern Caribbean, Florida, North Carolina ||  ||
|-
|  ||   ||  ||  || North Carolina, South Carolina, Virginia, West Virginia, Pennsylvania ||  ||  ||
|-
|  ||  ||  ||  || No land areas || 0 || None ||
|-
|  ||   ||  ||  || Central America, Cuba, Florida, Bahamas, Bermuda, Ireland, Great Britain ||  ||  ||
|-
|  ||   ||  ||  || Leeward Islands, Puerto Rico, Azores ||  ||  ||
|-
|  ||  ||  ||  || Leeward Islands, North Carolina, Mid-Atlantic States ||  ||  ||
|-
|  ||  ||  ||  || No land areas || 0 ||None ||
|-
|  ||  ||  ||  || Bermuda, Newfoundland, East Coast of the United States || None || Minimal ||
|-
|  ||  ||  ||  || Azores ||None|| None ||
|-
|  ||  ||  ||  || Windward Islands, Southeast Mexico, Louisiana ||  ||  ||
|-
|  ||  ||  ||  || Newfoundland || None || None ||
|-
|  ||  ||  ||  || North Carolina ||  ||  ||
|-
|  ||  ||  ||  || Guadeloupe, Hispaniola, Bahamas, Florida ||  ||  ||
|-
|  ||   ||  ||  || East Coast of the United States, Norway ||  || Minimal ||
|-
|  ||   ||  ||  || Central America  ||  ||
|-
|  ||  ||  ||  || Azores, Iberian Peninsula, British Isles || None ||  ||
|-
|  ||  ||  ||  || British Isles || None || None || 
|-
|  ||  ||  ||  || Bermuda, East Coast of the United States ||  || Minimal ||
|-
|  ||  ||  ||  || Cape Verde Islands || None || None ||
|-
|  ||  ||  ||  || Belize, Yucatán Peninsula, Veracruz ||  ||  ||
|-
|  ||  ||  ||  || Antilles, Bahamas, North Carolina, New Jersey, New York, Eastern Canada ||  ||
|-
|  ||  ||  ||  || Central America, Florida || None ||  ||
|-
|  ||   ||  ||  || No land areas || None || None ||
|-
|  ||  ||  ||  || Greater Antilles, Bahamas, United States East Coast ||  ||  ||
|-
|  ||  ||  ||  || East Coast of the United States || || Minimal ||
|-
|  ||  ||  ||  || Lesser Antilles || None || None ||
|-
|  ||  ||  ||  || Azores || None || None ||
|-
|  ||   ||  ||  || Nicaragua, Costa Rica, Panama ||  ||  ||
|-
|  ||  ||  ||  || No land areas || None || None ||
|-
|  ||  ||  ||  || Azores, Portugal, Spain, Ireland, United Kingdom ||  ||  ||
|-
|  ||   ||  ||  || Dominican Republic, Haiti, Cuba, The Bahamas, Florida, Bermuda || 2 || $25 million
|
|-
|  || ||  ||  ||Bermuda|| 1 || Minimal ||
|-
| || ||  ||  || Cayman Islands, Jamaica, Central America, Yucatán Peninsula, Gulf Coast of the United States, Southeastern United States, Mid-Atlantic, New England || 9 || $4.4 billion 
|
|-
| || ||  ||  || Lesser Antilles, Greater Antilles, Yucatán Peninsula, Central Mexico || 15 || $513 million 
|
|-
| || || || || Bermuda, Newfoundland|| 7 || $80 million
|
|-
!colspan=161|Overall reference for name, dates, duration, winds, pressure, and location:
|}

Other systems

Chenoweth has suggested that the following systems were Category 1 hurricanes on the Saffir-Simpson hurricane wind scale: 

|-
| Three ||  ||  ||  || The Caribbean, The Bahamas, Florida ||  ||  ||
|-
| Four ||  ||  ||  || Greater Antilles ||  ||  ||
|-
| Four ||  ||  ||  || Texas ||  ||  ||
|}

Listed by month

Landfalls

See also

 List of Category 4 Atlantic hurricanes
 List of Category 5 Atlantic hurricanes
 List of Category 3 Pacific hurricanes

References

List
Category 3
Atlantic 3